The anime series Shiki is an adaptation of the manga series drawn by Ryu Fujisaki, which is itself an adaptation of a novel of the same name by Fuyumi Ono. The story is about a small town in rural Japan named Sotoba, where a series of bizarre deaths occur. The series of deaths coincide with the arrival of the Kirishiki family, who has just moved into a castle built on the outskirts of town. Toshio Ozaki, director of the only hospital in Sotoba, begins to investigate and discovers there are supernatural presences at work, namely vampires, who are called shiki, translated in English as "corpse demon".

The series premiered on Fuji TV, Kansai TV, Tōkai TV and their affiliated stations on July 8, 2010. Funimation has acquired the license to simulcast the series one hour after its initial broadcast in Japan with English subtitles. The first of the DVDs and Blu-ray of the anime were released on October 27, 2010 by Aniplex.

Each episode title is a homophone pronunciation for the Japanese numerals using On'yomi, with each phrase mostly related to death or the corruption of the physical body, both common themes in the series. The series has four pieces of theme music. The first opening theme  is a song by Buck-Tick, while the first ending theme  is a song by nangi. The second opening theme is "Calendula Requiem" by kanon×kanon while the second ending theme is "Gekka Reijin" by Buck-Tick.


Episode listing

References

General
 

Specific

External links
 

Shiki
Shiki